King's Cliffe Banks is a  biological Site of Special Scientific Interest in King's Cliffe in Northamptonshire.

This former quarry has undulating calcareous grassland which is grazed by rabbits and cattle. It has a rich variety of flora, including sheep's fescue, dwarf thistle, mouse-ear hawkweed, wild thyme and common rock-rose. There are many bryophytes and lichens.

There is access to the site by a footpath from Bridge Street.

References

Sites of Special Scientific Interest in Northamptonshire